Pauline Elaine Davis-Thompson (born 9 July 1966) is a former Bahamian sprinter. She competed at five Olympics, a rarity for a track and field athlete.  She won her first medal at her fourth Olympics and her first gold medals at her fifth Olympics (Sydney 2000) at age 34 in the 4 × 100 m Relay and, after Marion Jones' belated disqualification nine years later, in the 200m.

Career

In 1984, she  was awarded the Austin Sealy Trophy for the
most outstanding athlete of the 1984 CARIFTA Games.

Her first high-profile success came in 1989 when she became the NCAA National Champion in the 200-meter dash while setting a collegiate national record as a member of the Alabama Crimson Tide team at the University of Alabama.   Then in 1995, she won the silver medal in the 200 metres at the IAAF World Indoor Championships and won another silver, this time in the 400 metres, at the 1995 World Championships in Athletics.

She ran at the 1996 Atlanta Olympics the following year and although she narrowly missed out on a medal in the 400 m, she helped the Bahamian team to a silver medal in the 4 x 100 metres relay. She suffered a dip in form in 1997 – she made both the 400 m and 100 m relay finals but failed to win a medal in either event. She received her first World Championships gold medal two years later, in 1999, aiding the Bahamian relay team to victory.

She won a gold medal in both the 200 metres and the 4 × 100 m relay at the 2000 Summer Olympics in Sydney. She originally finished in second place in the women's 200 m behind Marion Jones, but on 5 October 2007, Jones admitted to taking performance-enhancing steroids and was stripped of the title. On 9 December 2009, Davis-Thompson was finally awarded the gold medal.

After her track career, she went into athletics administration, being elected to the IAAF council in 2007.

Personal life

She is married to Jamaican Olympic hurdler (1992) Mark Thompson.

As a teenager, she had to constantly wear a sports bra to deal with her unoptimal physique at the time.

Personal bests

Achievements

References

External links
 
 
 

1966 births
Living people
Sportspeople from Nassau, Bahamas
Bahamian female sprinters
Olympic female sprinters
Olympic athletes of the Bahamas
Olympic gold medalists for the Bahamas
Olympic silver medalists for the Bahamas
Olympic gold medalists in athletics (track and field)
Olympic silver medalists in athletics (track and field)
Athletes (track and field) at the 1984 Summer Olympics
Athletes (track and field) at the 1988 Summer Olympics
Athletes (track and field) at the 1992 Summer Olympics
Athletes (track and field) at the 1996 Summer Olympics
Athletes (track and field) at the 2000 Summer Olympics
Medalists at the 1996 Summer Olympics
Medalists at the 2000 Summer Olympics
Commonwealth Games bronze medallists for the Bahamas
Commonwealth Games medallists in athletics
Athletes (track and field) at the 1990 Commonwealth Games
Athletes (track and field) at the 1994 Commonwealth Games
Pan American Games bronze medalists for the Bahamas
Pan American Games medalists in athletics (track and field)
Athletes (track and field) at the 1987 Pan American Games
Athletes (track and field) at the 1999 Pan American Games
Competitors at the 1986 Central American and Caribbean Games
Central American and Caribbean Games gold medalists for the Bahamas
Goodwill Games medalists in athletics
World Athletics Championships athletes for the Bahamas
World Athletics Championships winners
World Athletics Championships medalists
World Athletics Indoor Championships medalists
IAAF Continental Cup winners
Japan Championships in Athletics winners
Alabama Crimson Tide women's track and field athletes
Bahamian people of Jamaican descent
Central American and Caribbean Games medalists in athletics
Competitors at the 1998 Goodwill Games
Competitors at the 1990 Goodwill Games
Medalists at the 1987 Pan American Games
Medallists at the 1990 Commonwealth Games